Sivananda Yoga is a spiritual yoga system founded by Vishnudevananda; it includes the use of asanas (yoga postures) but is not limited to them as in systems of yoga as exercise.  He named this system, as well as the international Sivananda Yoga Vedanta Centres organization responsible for propagating its teachings, after his guru, Sivananda with the mission 'to spread the teachings of yoga and the message of world peace' which has since been refined to 'practice and teach the ancient yogic knowledge for health, peace, unity in diversity and self-realization.'

Some other yoga organizations follow Sivananda's teachings, including the Divine Life Society, Bihar School of Yoga, Integral Yoga (Satchidananda) and the Chinmaya Mission, but use different names for their yoga systems. Sivananda Yoga is the yoga system of the Sivananda Yoga Vedanta Centre organization and is based on Sivananda's teachings to synthesize the principles of the four paths of yoga (Yoga of Synthesis) along with the five points of yoga compiled by Vishnudevananda. The four classical paths of yoga consist of Karma Yoga, Bhakti Yoga, Raja Yoga and Jnana Yoga. These are Proper Exercise (āsana), Proper Breathing (prāṇāyāma), Proper Relaxation (śavāsana), Proper Diet and Positive Thinking (vedānta) and Meditation (dhyāna).

Starting in 2019, the Sivananda Yoga Vedanta Centres have dealt with widespread allegations of sexual abuse and rape by its founder Vishnudevananda and at least one other high-level leader of the organization.

Culture

Karma Yoga 

Sivananda Yoga, and the Sivananda Yoga Vedanta Centre organization that propagates its teachings, is run on the principles of selfless service, or karma yoga. The worldwide organization is staffed by volunteer workers, colloquially known as 'karma yogis'. At the Sivananda Yoga Vedanta Centre ashrams and centers around the world, volunteer service includes a wide variety of daily business tasks, such as preparation of meals, washing of dishes, garbage collection, grounds maintenance, teaching of yoga classes, marketing, and accounting.

The core belief in the need for volunteer workers propagated by the Sivananda Yoga tradition is that serving others is an essential practice to open the heart, as it diminishes selfishness and egoism, and brings practitioners closer to understanding the unity underlying all of creation. This practice of emphasizing the importance of selfless service was inherited from the teachings on karma yoga by Swami Sivananda.

Growing from Hierarchy into 'Unity in Diversity' 

Swami Vishnudevananda was the head of all operations of Sivananda Yoga and the Sivananda Yoga Vedanta Centre since its being established in 1959 until shortly before his death in 1993, when he assigned the responsibility of spreading the Sivananda Yoga teachings to an executive board of loyal disciples. The executive board now includes eight yoga acharyas, a term that means 'spiritual teacher'. Like many spiritual teachers, these acharyas are referred to by their spiritual names given to them as part of this particular tradition rather than the given names provided to them at birth. The Sivananda Yoga acharyas in charge of the organization are as follows: Swami Durgananda, European Acharya, Swami Sivadasananda, European Acharya, Swami Kailasananda, European Acharya, Swami Swaroopananda, Bahamas & Israel Acharya, Srinivasan, Acharya of the eastern region of the U.S., Swami Sitaramananda, Acharya of the western region of the U.S., Kanti Devi, Acharya of South America, and Prahlada, Acharya of Canada, India, and Thailand.

History

Swami Sivananda established the first Sivananda Ashram in 1932. His mission was to serve humanity by sharing his deep understanding of yoga, and in 1936, he founded the Divine Life Society to publish and freely distribute spiritual material. To make the teachings more accessible, he developed the Yoga of Synthesis, a combination of the formal doctrines of yoga – the four paths of yoga – that he summarized as follows: 'Serve. Love. Give. Purify. Meditate. Realize.'

Swami Sivananda of Rishikesh followed Swami Vivekananda's vision of yoga as having four parts, but asanas became more important in his teaching. In 1959, one of his main pupils, Swami Vishnudevananda, was sent to set to the West to continue these teachings. The Sivananda asana program had "a profound effect" on the development of modern yoga as exercise, which strongly emphasizes asanas. Another of Sivananda's pupils, Swami Satyananda Saraswati, founded the influential Bihar School of Yoga in 1964.  As well, his first Western female initiate, Swami Sivananda Radha, (1911 – 1995) founded Yasodhara Ashram in Nelson, British Columbia, Canada in 1951.

Allegations of sexual abuse and rape of female followers by Vishnudevananda started to become public in 2019 when his assistant Julie Salter posted her testimony about sexual abuse committed against her by the guru to Facebook on 10 December 2019. Since then, other followers have come forward with similar accounts.

Approach

Five points of yoga 

The Sivananda Yoga training system aims to teach an authentically Vedic system of yoga and believes that retaining the vitality of the body is a byproduct of the discipline and not the goal. The system philosophies are summarised in Vishnudevananda's 5 principles:

 Proper exercise: āsanas Enhances the flexibility of the joints, muscles, tendons and ligaments and stimulates circulation. Flexibility and strength of the spine keep the body youthful.
 Proper breathing: prāṇāyāma Connects the body to the solar plexus, which is considered a storehouse of energy. Stress and depression can be overcome by breathing more deeply with increased awareness.
 Proper relaxation: śavāsana Relieves the body of existing stress symptoms (including muscle tension and breathlessness) and also helps develop resistance against external stress factors. Once body and mind are freed from constant overload they are at ease and perform more efficiently.
 Proper diet: vegetarian, including fruit, vegetables, grains, nuts, seeds, legumes, and milk. Such foods are sattvic. Less suitable are rajasic foods like spices, fish, or stimulants such as tea, coffee, and chocolate; and tamasic foods like meat, alcohol, onions, and vinegar.
 Positive thinking and meditation: vedānta and dhyāna Eliminates negative thought patterns and provides an experience of inner peace by controlling the mind through meditation. Sivananda Yoga considers this to be the key to peace of mind.

Twelve basic asanas

Sivananda Yoga identifies a group of twelve āsanas as basic.  Emphasis is on mastering these twelve basic āsanas first, from which variations are then added to further deepen into the practice. The twelve asanas in the Sivananda Yoga system follow a precise order, allowing for a systematic balanced engagement of every major part of the body - with the primary intention being to allow the prana, or life force energy, to circulate more freely.

A session of hatha yoga typically starts with practitioners resting in śavāsana, continuing onto prāṇāyāma (breathing exercises) kapalabhati and anuloma viloma, followed by 6-8 rounds of sūrya namaskār, before the standard program of the 12 basic āsanas. A hatha yoga session averages between 90–120 minutes.

References

Further reading 

 Swami Vishnudevananda (1960) The Complete Illustrated Book of Yoga, Three Rivers Press, New York. 
 The Sivananda Companion to Yoga (1981-2000), Gaia Books, Fireside, New York. 
 
 
 
 Yoga Mind and Body (1996, 2008), Dorling Kindersley, London. 
 The Sivananda Companion to Meditation (2003), Gaia Books, Fireside, New York. 
 Yoga: Your Home Practice Companion (2009), Dorling Kindersley, London.

External links

Official website
Sivananda Yoga 30 min practice - Sivananda Yoga Centre, Gurgaon
Sivananda Yoga 60 min Practice - Sivananda Yoga Centre, Gurgaon

Modern Denominational Yoga
Yoga styles
Yoga schools